Irina Gerasimova (born 9 February 1964) is a retired Russian swimmer who won two bronze medals in medley events at the 1982 World Aquatics Championships and 1983 European Aquatics Championships. She also competed at the 1980 Summer Olympics in the 4 × 100 m freestyle relay, but her team was disqualified for an improper changeover. She won the 200 m and 400 m medley events at the 1983 Universiade.

References

1964 births
Living people
Swimmers at the 1980 Summer Olympics
Soviet female freestyle swimmers
Soviet female medley swimmers
Olympic swimmers of the Soviet Union
World Aquatics Championships medalists in swimming
European Aquatics Championships medalists in swimming
Universiade medalists in swimming
Universiade gold medalists for the Soviet Union
Universiade bronze medalists for the Soviet Union
Medalists at the 1983 Summer Universiade
People from Kutaisi